"Last Time in Paris" is a song by progressive metal band Queensrÿche, appearing in the 1990 action film The Adventures of Ford Fairlane. It was released as a radio single from the film's soundtrack album.

The song can also be found as a bonus track on remastered reissues of the band's 1990 album Empire, during which sessions it was originally recorded.

Track listing

Chart performance

References

Queensrÿche songs
1990 singles
Songs written by Chris DeGarmo
Songs written by Geoff Tate
1990 songs
EMI Records singles